is a children's picture book by Kiyo Tanaka (田中清代 Tanaka Kiyo), published in 2018 by . David Boyd wrote the English translation, published in 2021 by Enchanted Lion Books.

The book involves a little girl who sees a creature and goes on an adventure with it, before meeting her father at the end of the book.

It was published in French, as La petite chose noire, with translation by Alice Hureau.

Reception
The book and its author won the "Purple Island Award", of Nami Island International Picture Book Illustration Concours 2019.

Kirkus Reviews stated that for the most part the work is "poignant and engrossing narrative" although it argued the aspect of her going into a closet at the creature's request "gives serious pause".

Kimberly Olson Fakih of School Library Journal stated that the art style illustrates "a timeless quality."

 (東雅夫 Higashi Masao) of Asahi Shimbun gave a positive review, praising the "fine copper engraving technique".

References

External links
 The Little One - Enchanted Lion Books
 The Little One -  

2018 children's books
Japanese picture books